Sheerwater F.C. are a Non-League football club who are based in Sheerwater, in Woking, Surrey, England.

History
The club was founded in 1958, by John French, and they began life as members of the Woking & District League.  After achieving Intermediate status, they joined the Surrey County Intermediate League (Western) in 1967. The club was a founding member of the Home Counties League in 1978, which was renamed a year later to the Combined Counties League. They are currently members of the Combined Counties League Division One.

The Jam played some of their early gigs at the clubhouse, before releasing their breakthrough song "In The City".  Paul Weller, Bruce Foxton and Rick Buckler all went to Sheerwater Secondary School which is now called The David Brown Secondary School and is situated adjacent to Sheerwater Football Club.

The club has played in the Combined Counties League since the 2000s, although they did enjoy a brief spell in the Combined Counties in the early 1980s.  For most of their time in the Combined Counties First Division, they have finished either mid-table or bottom of the league yet survived in this league due to a lack of suitable replacements from Step 7.

The club were the victim of a hoax in 2007 when investment into the club was promised but not delivered. The event could have spelt the end of the club, but they survived into the current decade.

Club Stalwart Trevor Wenden has been at the club in a number of different capacities since the 1970s.

Ground

Sheerwater played their home games at Woking Athletic Ground, Sheerwater Recreation Ground, Blackmore Crescent, Sheerwater, Woking, Surrey, GU21 5QJ until the end of the 2017/18 season. From August 2018 until the end of the 2020/21, The Sheers played their home games at the Kingfield Stadium, home to National League club Woking while their new Eastwood Centre ground, which houses a third generation artificial pitch and forms part of a multi-leisure facility, was being built in the grounds of Bishop David Brown School in Sheerwater.

The Sheers commemorated the official opening of Eastwood with a fixture against Woking on 24 July 2021, which resulted in a 3–0 home defeat. The ground has a capacity of 600 spectators.

Club Records
 Highest League Position:
 1st in Combined Counties League Division One: 2018-19
 4th in Combined Counties League Division One: 2017-18
 9th in Combined Counties League Division One: 2008-09, 2016-17, 
 16th in Combined Counties League Premier Division: 2019-20
 10th in Combined Counties League Premier Division: 2020-21
 9th in Combined Counties League Premier Division: 2021-22
 FA VASE
 1st Round Proper: 2018-19 lost 6–0 away to Southall
 FA CUP
 Extra Preliminary: 2019-20 lost 2–1 away to CB Hounslow

References

External links
 
 
 Information on Sheerwater FC given in Knaphill v Sheerwater Club Programme, April 2010)

Football clubs in England
Football clubs in Surrey
Association football clubs established in 1958
1958 establishments in England
Surrey County Intermediate League (Western)
Combined Counties Football League